Saint-Tropez Games was a popular TV show broadcast in Italy, Romania, Russia and Ukraine.  It was presented by Dan Negru.

Results

02.07.2006 edition

06.07.2006 edition

8.07.2006 edition

10.07.2006 edition

20.08.2006 edition

Romanian television series
Italian sports television series
Italian game shows
Antena 1 (Romania) original programming